Tiruvalithayam Tiruvallesvarar Temple is a temple dedicated to the Hindu deity Shiva, located at Padi, a north-western neighbourhood of Chennai, India.  Shiva is worshiped as Tiruvalleswarar, and is represented by the lingam and his consort Parvati is depicted as Jagadambiga. The presiding deity is revered in the 7th century Tamil Saiva canonical work, the Tevaram, written by Tamil poet saints known as the nayanars and classified as Paadal Petra Sthalam.

This temple is associated with sage Bharadwaja, who worshipped the presiding deity in the form of a sparrow, giving the name Thiruvalithayam to the temple. There are many inscriptions associated with the temple indicating contributions from Cholas. The oldest parts of the present masonry structure were built during the Chola dynasty during the 11th century, while later expansions, are attributed to later periods.

The temple houses a three-tiered gateway tower known as gopuram. The temple has numerous shrines, with those of Tiruvalleswarar and Jagadambiga being the most prominent. The temple complex houses many halls and two precincts. The temple has four daily rituals at various times from 6:30 a.m. to 8 p.m., and five yearly festivals on its calendar. The Brahmotsavam during the Tamil month of Chittirai is the most prominent festival celebrated in the temple. The temple is now maintained and administered by Hindu Religious and Charitable Endowments Department of the Government of Tamil Nadu.

Legend
As per Hindu legend, the sage Bharadwaja worshipped the presiding deity in the form of a sparrow named Valiyan. The place was hence called Valithayam, meaning the one worshipped by a sparrow. Padi historically is referred to the place used to store armory.  The God here is worshipped by Ramar, Bharathwajar, Anjaneyar, Surya, Chandra, Indran and Valiyan. During the medieval times, the place was the site for multiple wars, which raged the structure of the temple. As per Tamil mention, the resting place near a war field is called Padi, which lead to the modern name of the place. As per another legend, Planet Jupiter who was cursed by Menaka. On the advice of Markendeya, he reached this place, got a dip and worshipped the presiding deity and got relief from the curse. Devotees pray to the Jupiter to get remedy for their relief from sins. The historic name of the place is Thiruvalidayil, which went on to become Thiruvalithayam.

History
The original structure of the temple is believed to have been built by The temple is closely associated with Rajaraja Chola III. There are 14 inscriptions from the Chola empire, with the oldest dating back to Tribuvana Chakravarthy Vijayakanda Gopalan who donated multiple jewels to Nachiyar. The inscriptions are counted as 214-28 of 1910. As per the inscriptions, during the regime of Rajaraja III, the temple was in a place called Chintamanipuram. The temple is referred as Ambattur Nadu, Puzhar kottam and Jayamkonda Cholapuram in various inscriptions. The inscriptions denote the presiding deity as Thiruvalithamudaya Nayanar and the Ambal as Thiruveethi Nachiyar. During the period of Rajaraja, a devotee named Chalukya Naranan Yathavarayan donated two houses and two gardens to the temple. The other inscriptions indicate gifts in the form of lamps, food and gold to the temple by various devotees and ruling kings.

Architecture
The temple is located in Padi, a neighbourhood in Chennai and the nearest railhead, Korattur is 2.2 km away from the temple. The temple has three prakarams (closed precincts of a temple) and many mandapams (halls). The temple faces east  and is entered via a three-tiered pyramidal rajagopuram (gateway tower). The presiding deity in the form of lingam is housed in the sanctum in Gajabrashta shape (sitting pose of an elephant). The attached hall, the ardhamandapa measures the same width as the sanctum, while its length is twice the sanctum. The ardhamandapa projects towards the east. The Mukhamandapa has a square structure. There are five devakoshtas that cover the exterior walls of the sanctum. The images of Dakshinamurthy and Brahma are the only ones remaining out of the five. There is a separate shrine of Somaskanda in the temple. The presiding deity of the temple is Tiruvallesvarar, housed in the sactum. The consort is Jagadambika is located in a parallel shrine. There is a view point from where both the deities can be viewed. The temple has four bodies of water associated with it. The principal water tank is called Bharathwaja Theertham, while the other three are Brahma Theertham, Agasthiya Theertham and Sheera Nadhi. The temple has a separate shrine for Dakshinamurthy (Guru).

Worship practices and religious importance

The temple priests perform the puja (rituals) during festivals and on a daily basis. Like other Shiva temples of Tamil Nadu, the priests belong to the Shaiva community, a Brahmin sub-caste. The temple rituals are performed four times a day; Ushathkalam at 6:30 a.m., Kalasanthi at 8:00 a.m., Uchikalam at 12:00 p.m., Sayarakshai at 5:00 p.m., and Ardha Jamam at 8:00 p.m. Each ritual comprises four steps: abhisheka (sacred bath), alangaram (decoration), naivethanam (food offering) and deepa aradanai (waving of lamps) for both Tiruvalleswarar and Jagadambika. The worship is held amidst music with nagaswaram (pipe instrument) and tavil (percussion instrument), religious instructions in the Vedas (sacred texts) read by priests and prostration by worshipers in front of the temple mast. Mahashivaratri during February–March are the other festivals celebrated in the temple. The Brahmotsavam during the Tamil month of Chittirai is the most prominent festival celebrated in the temple.

Tirugnana Sambandar, the 7th-century Tamil Saivite poet, venerated Thiruvalleswarar, which are compiled in the Tirumurai. As the temple is revered in Tevaram, it is classified as Paadal Petra Sthalam, one of the 275 temples that find mention in the Saiva canon.  The temple history has been compiled by Kalyanasundara Mudaliyar. The temple is frequented during Thursdays by devotees as it is counted as the Guru Stala in Chennai.

See also
Heritage structures in Chennai

References

External links

Hindu temples in Chennai